Santo Amaro da Imperatriz, or simply Santo Amaro, is a municipality in Santa Catarina located close to the state capital Florianópolis and is connected to Palhoça by BR-282 in the northeast.

Location

The municipality contains part of the  Serra do Tabuleiro State Park, a protected area created in 1975.
The lushly-forested park protects the sources of the Vargem do Braço, Cubatão and D'Una rivers, which supply most of the drinking water for greater Florianópolis and the south coast region.
There are several farms in the municipality. The only urban zone is situated in Downtown Santo Amaro.

Parties and festivals
The Festa do Divino Espírito Santo (Divine Holy Spirit Party) is the main religious celebration of the Florianópolis Region. Festa do Milho (Corn Festival) is another important festival of Santo Amaro.

Economy
Even though Santo Amaro is a small city, important enterprises were founded in the city. Imperatriz Supermarkets was founded in 1974 and is the most profitable supermarket of Santa Catarina. É de Casa Supermarkets is also another important supermarkets network.

Auto Viação Imperatriz is the bus enterprise that drives people to Águas Mornas, Palhoça, São José and Florianópolis. Imperatriz is also another important enterprise that manufactures ice-cream.

As Santo Amaro is mainly a rural city, their economy is based on it.

References

Municipalities in Santa Catarina (state)